The Pakistan women's cricket team played the Bangladesh women's cricket team in Bangladesh in October 2018. The tour consisted of four Women's Twenty20 Internationals (WT20Is) matches and one Women's One Day International (WODI) match. Pakistan Women won the WT20I series 3–0, after the first match was washed out. Bangladesh Women won the one-off WODI match by six wickets.

Squads

WT20I series

1st WT20I

2nd WT20I

3rd WT20I

4th WT20I

WODI match

Only WODI

References

External links
 Series home at ESPN Cricinfo

2018 in Bangladeshi cricket
2018 in Pakistani cricket
International cricket competitions in 2018–19
Pakistan women's national cricket team
2018 in women's cricket
2018 in Bangladeshi women's sport
2018 in Pakistani women's sport